az-Zubaidat is a Palestinian village in the Jericho Governorate in the eastern West Bank situated in the Jordan Valley, located 27 kilometers north of Jericho. According to the Palestinian Central Bureau of Statistics, az-Zubaidat had a population of over 1,340 inhabitants in mid-year 2006.

Location
It is bordered by the Jordan River to the east, Marj Na'ja to the north, Tubas  to the west, and Marj al Ghazal to the south.

History
In the wake of the 1948 Arab–Israeli War, and after the 1949 Armistice Agreements, az-Zubaidat came under Jordanian rule. It was annexed by Jordan in 1950. 

Since the Six-Day War in 1967, az-Zubaidat has been under Israeli occupation.

In 1970, Israel confiscated land from az-Zubaidat in order to construct the settlement of Argaman.

After the 1995 accords, 1% of the az-Zubaidat's land was classified as Area A, the remaining 99% as Area C.

In 1997, refugees constituted 96% of the population. The primary health care facilities for the village are designated by the Ministry of Health as level 2. In January 2010 Robert Fisk reported that the EU-funded installation of a wast-water system was stopped by the Israelis, as part of what he called  "ethnic cleansing via bureaucracy".

References

External links
Az Zubeidat Village (Fact Sheet), Applied Research Institute - Jerusalem (ARIJ)
Az Zubeidat Village Profile  (ARIJ)
Az Zubeidat aerial photo (ARIJ)
 Locality Development Priorities and Needs in Az Zubeidat (ARIJ)

Jericho Governorate
Villages in the West Bank
Municipalities of the State of Palestine